The elderberry borer, Desmocerus palliatus, is a species of Cerambycidae that occurs in Eastern North America.

Description
The adult is 17 to 26 mm, mostly a shimmering dark blue, and the bases of the elytra are yellow to yellow-red. It is likely a mimic of beetles in the family Lycidae, as is the moth Lycomorpha pholus found in the same area.

Range and habitat
It ranges from Oklahoma, central North America, to parts of the southern Appalachian mountains. They tend to be more abundant in the northern part of its range. They can be seen in swampy areas and near streams that support their host plant.

Life cycle
Eggs are laid near stems or at the base of the plant, the larvae then burrow their way into the stems and eat tunnels into the roots of the living plant. They can be seen between April and August.
Adult food
Pollen
Sambucus
Larval food
Sambucus

References

External links 
 

Beetles of North America
Lepturinae
Beetles described in 1771
Taxa named by Johann Reinhold Forster